Zahra Rahmat Allah (born 1954) is a Yemeni short story writer. She studied English literature at Aden University and worked at Saba, the state news agency. She was also chief editor of the magazine of the Yemeni Women's Union. Her first book of short stories was titled Bidaya Ukhra (Another Beginning) was published from Sanaa in 1994. Her story "The Secret" won a BBC short story competition in 2007.

References

Yemeni women writers
Yemeni women journalists
1954 births
Living people
Yemeni short story writers
Women short story writers
20th-century short story writers
20th-century journalists
21st-century short story writers
21st-century journalists
20th-century Yemeni writers
20th-century Yemeni women writers
21st-century Yemeni writers
21st-century Yemeni women writers